is a synchronized swimming coach originally from Japan. She is the head coach of the Spanish National Synchronized Swimming Team.

Early career as a swimmer 
Due to the influence of her parents, who were both avid swimmers, Fujiki learned swimming at an early age. When she was seven years old, she began attending a swimming school in Osaka and started to learn synchronized swimming. When she was 14 years old, she won the Japanese National Junior Olympic and was selected to represent Japan at the Junior World Championships.

In 1992, Fujiki moved to the United States and attended the Las Lomas High School in Walnut Creek, California. While she was in Walnut Creek, she joined the Walnut Creek Aquanuts, which was regarded as one of the best synchronized swimming teams in the world at that time. At Aquanuts, she was trained by coaches such as Gail Pucci, a world champion herself, whose creativity and the skill as a coach has been teaching how to be a teacher for the athletes. Fujiki also sought guidance from Santa Clara Aquamaide's Chris Caver, who remains as a close confidant and mentor to Fujiki since she retired from swimming and began coaching. The mentorship and guidance by these seasoned veterans continue to support Fujiki navigating her career to this day.

While at Aquanuts, she met her future teammates and notable synchronized swimmers such as Tamara Crow DeClercq and Heather Pease Olsen. In 1993, she won the solo-preliminary category at the U.S. Open Synchronized Swimming Championships in Irvine, CA. After successfully completing her junior year at the Las Lomas High School, Fujiki returned to Japan in 1993. After completing high school in Japan, she moved to Tokyo to attend the Nihon University, where she studied English Literature and specialized in Intercultural Communications. While she was at Nihon University, she joined the Tokyo Synchronized Swimming Club. 

In 1995, she was selected to be part of the Japanese National Team for the 1996 World Cup. Then in 1996, she was selected to be one of the swimmers to represent Japan in the Atlanta Olympics. There were only team events at the Atlanta Olympics and Fujiki's team won a bronze medal.

In 1997, as part of the Japanese National Team, she participated in a Duet event and won another bronze medal in the Swiss Open Championships.
In 1998, Fujiki moved back to California to join the Walnut Creek Aquanuts again and took part in the US National Championships and US Open in 2000. She was also one of the eight American swimmers that performed in the Rome and Spain Opens in 1999 and 2000, respectively. 

In 2000, she retired from swimming and began coaching in 2001 at Walnut Creek Aquanuts.

Coaching career 

Before 2010
Between 2003 and 2010, she worked as a coach for the Spanish National Team. She trained some of the most notable synchronized swimmers of that time, including Gemma Mengual, Paola Tirados and Andrea Fuentes. Spanish Team had a series of breakthrough victories under Fujiki's coaching, frequently competing for the top three medals with Russia, Japan and US. Fujiki led the team to win three medals in 2003 Barcelona World Championships (the first time for Spain to win a medal in World Championships), 2005 Montreal, and 2007 Melbourne World Championships.

In 2008 at the Beijing Olympics, her team won its first silver medal.

Leading US National Team (2010-2014)
From 2010, she served as the head coach for the US national team, which competed in the duet at the finals in London Olympics.

In 2011, she was the head coach of the US National team that competed at the Pan American Games held in Mexico City.

Leading Chinese National Team (2014-2017)
In 2014, she became the head coach of the Chinese national team. The Chinese team at that time was thriving but remained outside of the mainstream synchronized swimming paradigm. Fujiki introduced a new approach and concept and she led the Chinese national team to earn the highest score in its history, resulting in both team and duet winning the silver medals.

Leading Spanish National Team (2017- current)
In 2017, the Spanish Federation announced Fujiki's appointment as the head coach of the Spanish National Team. This announcement came during a period where the Spanish National Team had experienced a decline in scores, costing the team qualification to the Rio 2016 Olympic Games. Fujiki entered the position with hopes to bring "a different approach to show the unique ‘Spanish’ synchro" and "to build fundamental techniques in individual swimmers" with a new generation of swimmers.

In less than two years after being appointed as the head coach of the Spanish National Team, Fujiki led a team of young swimmers to earn a bronze medal in the newly established Highlight category in 2019 at the FINA World Championship. This feat marked the end of the "dark period" of the Spanish Team of not earning any medals in two consecutive world championships.

Ona Carbonell, FINA's  most decorated female swimmer, said when you are training under Fujiki, the athletes do not need to hesitate or resist anything because they can all trust her completely. Carbonell gushes about Fujiki's wealth of knowledge and experiences in terms of artistic, technical, and planning elements and calls her the most complete and comprehensive coach she has ever worked with.

Choreography 
Fujiki received high accolades for her choreography, music selection and production. She has been invited by national teams in Australia, Greece, Hungary, the Hunan Province, and Colombia as a choreographer.
Ona Carbonell, who is recognized as the most decorated female swimmer by FINA, credits Fujiki's routine for earning the 2019 World Championship medal. In this routine, Fujiki used only the speech of Nelson Mandela about how sports unite people instead of relying on conventional music as an accompaniment to the performance.

Speakers 
Fujiki has been involved in the FINA's effort to promote synchronized swimming globally, and served as a lecturer at FINA's promotional program called FINA Development Clinic, which is part of the Olympic Solidarity Program, in Argentina, New Zealand, Cuba and Panama.

Other episodes 
She was selected as Newsweek Japan's 100 Japanese Respected by the World (世界で尊敬される日本人100人).

When the Spanish team won the first silver medal at the 2008 Beijing Olympics, the Spanish media recognized Fujiki as the catalyst who not only helped the team to excel, but also revolutionized Spanish training style.

After Fujiki left the Spain team in 2013, one of the swimmers commented to the local newspaper how Fujiki's departure meant the end of synchronized swimming in her.

Sun Wenyan, who was trained by both Fujiki and another Japanese coach, Masayo Imura, was asked the difference between the two coaches. Sun explained that while Imura places an emphasis on technique, Fujiki focuses on the artistic expression. The goal of practice under Fujiki's coaching is not for the sake of practicing, but for the swimmers to be able to express their emotions fully during the competition.

References

External links 

 Mayuko Fujiki Named Spain’s New Head Coach
 New Age in Spain with Mayuko Fujiki
 スポーツ 歴史の検証 - Sports History Profile
 中国シンクロの藤木麻佑子コーチ　革新と変化をもたらす - Synchro coach Mayuko Fujiki brings innovation and change
 突破する力　藤木麻祐子 - Mayuko Fujiki Makes Breakthrough

Japanese female swimmers
1975 births
Living people
Synchronized swimmers at the 1996 Summer Olympics
Olympic bronze medalists for Japan
Olympic medalists in synchronized swimming
Japanese expatriates in Spain
Japanese expatriate sportspeople in the United States
Japanese expatriate sportspeople in China
Synchronized swimming coaches
Medalists at the 1996 Summer Olympics